Al-Aziziya Sport Club, is an Iraqi football team based in Al-Aziziya, Wasit, that plays in Iraq Division Three.

Stadium
On June 15, 2019, the Ministry of Youth and Sports opened the Al-Aziziyah Stadium, with a capacity of 5,000 spectators, and the opening match was held between the former Iraq national football team stars and the former Wasit players team. Other sporting events were held, and performances were presented for the taekwondo team and athletics for men and women..

Managerial history
 Karim Hachim
 Jassim Abdullah
 Hassan Arab

See also 
 2000–01 Iraqi Elite League
 2002–03 Iraq FA Cup
 2021–22 Iraq FA Cup

References

External links
 Al-Aziziya SC on Goalzz.com
 Iraq Clubs- Foundation Dates

1992 establishments in Iraq
Association football clubs established in 1992
Football clubs in Wasit